Sandro Coelho Leite (born 27 June 1976 in Rio de Janeiro) is a retired Brazilian football midfielder who spent most of his career playing in the Bolivian Premier División for The Strongest.

Career
Coelho developed his career at the youth ranks of Botafogo de Futebol e Regatas. He later played professionally for Brazilian clubs América Football Club in 1995, and Esporte Clube Bahia in 1996. The following year, Coelho arrived in La Paz to play for The Strongest. From the beginning he caused a good impression and the club decided to acquire his transfer. As his career progressed, Coelho became a key player for the team and a symbol for the club as he helped the institution obtain two national titles. During 2007 he added another title to his resume by winning the Clausura tournament with Club San José. After two years in Oruro, he return to his beloved The Strongest in 2009.

On 26 April 2009, during a league match against Blooming, Coelho became the club's all-time leading scorer in first division football. He scored 2 goals to reach a total of 80, surpassing former striker Ovidio Messa who previously led with 78. Moreover, he is the derby's (The Strongest vs. Bolívar) all-time topscorer with 10 goals.

On 1 June 2009, Coelho assumed the position of first team manager, after the resignation of Julio Toresani. His stint lasted until early 2010.

Honours

Club
 The Strongest
 Liga de Fútbol Profesional Boliviano: 2003 (A), 2003 (C), 2004 (C)
 San José
 Liga de Fútbol Profesional Boliviano: 2007 (C)

References

External links
 
 
 

1976 births
Living people
Association football midfielders
Botafogo de Futebol e Regatas players
America Football Club (RJ) players
Esporte Clube Bahia players
The Strongest players
Club San José players
Bolivian Primera División players
Brazilian expatriate footballers
Brazilian expatriate sportspeople in Bolivia
Expatriate footballers in Bolivia
Brazilian football managers
The Strongest managers
Independiente Petrolero managers
Bolivian Primera División managers
Brazilian expatriate football managers
Expatriate football managers in Bolivia
Footballers from Rio de Janeiro (city)
Brazilian footballers
Club San José managers